100 Questions (originally known as 100 Questions for Charlotte Payne) is an American sitcom television series which ran on NBC from May 27 to July 1, 2010. In May 2009 the network announced that the show would debut midseason in March 2010 on Tuesday nights at 9:30 pm, after NBC's coverage of the 2010 Winter Olympics was completed. However the show was later pushed back to debut on May 27, 2010, with the episode order reduced from thirteen to six. 100 Questions was produced by Universal Media Studios, with executive producers Christopher Moynihan, Kelly Kulchak, Ron West, and Michelle Nader.

On July 8, 2010, NBC cancelled the series after one season.

Plot
100 Questions is about "a young woman navigating life with friends in New York." Charlotte Payne (played by British actress Sophie Winkleman) begins each episode being asked a question at a dating service, which then "segues into that episode's storyline."

Cast
 Sophie Winkleman – Charlotte Payne
 David Walton – Wayne Rutherford
 Christopher Moynihan – Mike Poole
 Collette Wolfe – Jill
 Smith Cho – Leslie
 Michael Benjamin Washington – Andrew

Production
The initial pilot episode was directed by Emmy Award-winning director James Burrows and produced by Maggie Blanc. It featured Elizabeth Ho as Leslie, Joy Suprano as Jill, and Amir Talai as Andrew. Alex Hardcastle subsequently stepped in as director for the series, reshooting the pilot with recasts Cho, Wolfe, and Washington as Leslie, Jill, and Andrew.

Episodes
Every episode was directed by Alex Hardcastle.

Ratings

Seasonal

Episodic

References

External links
 

Episode list using the default LineColor
2010s American sitcoms
2010 American television series debuts
2010 American television series endings
2010s American sex comedy television series
English-language television shows
NBC original programming
2010s American romantic comedy television series
Television series by Universal Television
Television shows set in New York City